Segopotje Senior Secondary School is a secondary school situated in Mashite, Ga Mphahlele, Limpopo Province, South Africa. The School started in 1992 as a junior secondary school as it only had Grade 8 up to 10. It became Segopotje Senior Secondary in 1997 and it is currently one of Limpopo Province's most successful secondary schools.

References

Schools in Limpopo
Educational institutions established in 1992
High schools in South Africa
1992 establishments in South Africa